The Executive Council is the former title of the Council of Ministers, the principal executive body of the Isle of Man Government.  Its chairman was the Lieutenant Governor until 1980, when he was replaced by a Chairman elected by Tynwald. The Chairman was renamed Chief Minister in 1986, and the council was renamed Council of Ministers in 1990.

The Executive Council was established following the 1949 General Election, "to assist the Lieutenant Governor in the performance of his duties", as successor to an executive committee of Tynwald which was set up in 1946.  The Council originally consisted of the two members of the House of Keys and the following five members:

Chairman of the Board of Agriculture and Fisheries
Chairman of the Board of Highways and Transport
Chairman of the Board of Social Services
Chairman of the Board of Local Government
Chairman of the Board of Education

Members

References

Government of the Isle of Man
History of the Isle of Man